On June 1, 1973, the British colony of British Honduras changed its name to Belize, but its status remained unchanged until 1981, when Belize was granted independence.

Coins of the Colony of Belize (1973–80)
The coins of the Colony of Belize retain the same basic designs as on the coins of British Honduras, but with the country's name changed to "Belize". These coins were struck at the Royal Mint, Llantrisant. A series of numismatic coins, depicting the Belizean Coat-of-Arms on the obverse instead of the Queen's portrait, were struck at the Franklin Mint. These coins were generally intended for American collectors, however, and did not circulate in Belize.

Coins of Belize (1981–)

The coins of the 1981 issue are regarded by collectors as being the first official coins of Belize. Most coins since independence have been struck at the Royal Mint, and still bear the British Honduras-style coin designs. Queen Elizabeth II, the Queen in right of Belize, is still featured on Belizean coins facing right and wearing the heraldic Tudor Crown.

Post independence coins

Gallery

References

Belize